The 2019 West Asian Football Federation Championship, also called Asiacell WAFF Championship Iraq 2019 due to sponsorship by Asiacell, was the 9th edition of the WAFF Championship, an international tournament for member nations of the West Asian Football Federation (WAFF). It was hosted in Iraq for the first time, in the cities of Karbala and Erbil.

The tournament was meant to be held from 8 to 17 December 2017 in Amman, Jordan, but was postponed to a later date, and subsequently moved to Iraq on 21 May 2018. It was then expected to be held in November 2018, but yet again postponed to July–August 2019.

All WAFF members, excluding title holders Qatar, Oman and the United Arab Emirates, participated in the competition. Of the nine teams, seven had also appeared in the previous tournament in 2014. A total of 17 matches were played in two venues across two cities. The final took place on 14 August at the Karbala Sports City in Karbala, between hosts Iraq and Bahrain. Bahrain won the match 1–0 to claim their first WAFF Championship title, marking the second consecutive title won by a Gulf team.

Teams

Participants
A total of nine teams participated in the competition. All WAFF members, other than Oman, Qatar and the United Arab Emirates, agreed to take part in the tournament.

Draw
The teams were distributed on 26 June 2019 in Erbil according to their requests. The nine teams were drawn into two groups: Group A with 5 teams and Group B with 4. While the draw was intended to be held between 18 and 20 July 2019, some teams requested the organizing committee to play in Erbil, therefore placing them in Group B, with the rest of the teams being placed in Group A to play in Karbala. The two group winners directly advanced to the final.

The draw for the group fixtures was held on 20 July 2019 at the Iraq Football Association headquarters in Baghdad.

Squads 

Each team had to register a squad of 23 players, three of whom must be goalkeepers.

Officiating

Referees
 Wathik Al-Baag (Iraq)
 Mohammed Al-Noori (Iraq)
 Mohammad Arafah (Jordan)
 Turki Al-Khudhayr (Saudi Arabia)
 Ali Al-Samaheeji (Bahrain)
 Saad Khalefah  (Kuwait)
 Wissam Rabie (Syria)
 Mohamad Issa (Lebanon)
 Sameh Al-Qassas (Palestine)
 Mahmood Al-Majarafi (Oman)
 Haitham Al-Walidi (Yemen)

Assistant Referees
 Muayad Mohamed Ali (Iraq)
 Jihad Dawood (Iraq)
 Mahmoud Abu-Thaher (Jordan)
 Khalaf Al-Shammari (Saudi Arabia)
 Salah Janahi (Bahrain)
 Humoud Al-Sahli (Kuwait)
 Abdullah Kanaan (Syria)
 Ali Mokdad (Lebanon)
 Amin Shaban Halabi (Palestine)
 Hamed Al-Ghafri (Oman)
 Ali Al-Hasani (Yemen)

Venues

Group stage
The WAFF announced the tournament schedule on 20 July 2019. The group winners advance to the final.

All times are local, AST (UTC+3).

Group A

Group B

Final

Statistics

Goalscorers

Final ranking
As per statistical convention in football, matches decided in extra time are counted as wins and losses, while matches decided by penalty shoot-outs are counted as draws.

Prize money
Prize money amounts were announced in 2019.

Broadcasting rights
The WAFF sold the broadcasting rights for the 2019 WAFF Championship to the following broadcasters.

References

External links
 Official website

 
2019

2019 in Asian football
International association football competitions hosted by Iraq
Sport in Karbala
Sport in Erbil
2019 in Iraqi sport
July 2019 sports events in Iraq
August 2019 sports events in Iraq